The Edoardo Amaldi ATV, or Automated Transfer Vehicle 003 (ATV-003), was a European uncrewed cargo spacecraft, named after the 20th-century Italian physicist Edoardo Amaldi. The spacecraft was launched by the European Space Agency (ESA) on 23 March 2012, on a mission to supply the International Space Station (ISS) with propellant, water, oxygen, and dry cargo.

Edoardo Amaldi was the third ATV to be built, following Jules Verne (2008) and Johannes Kepler (2011). The ATV completed its mission successfully, and was deorbited on 3 October 2012, burning up in the Earth's atmosphere as planned.

Mission payload

 Source: ESA

Amaldi letter
In addition to its primary cargo, the ATV carried a reproduction of a letter written by its namesake, Edoardo Amaldi, in 1958. This document, whose original is of significant historical value, reflects Amaldi's vision of a peaceful and non-military European space organisation – a blueprint for the real-life ESA.

Mission summary

Launch
Edoardo Amaldi arrived at the Guiana Space Centre in Kourou, French Guiana, in August 2011 to undergo pre-launch preparations. The spacecraft was mounted on an Ariane 5ES rocket, and was launched on 23 March 2012 by Arianespace on behalf of the European Space Agency.

Docking
The ATV docked with the ISS on 28 March 2012, five days after its launch. In addition to resupplying the Expedition 30 astronauts, Edoardo Amaldi used its thrusters to boost the station's altitude.

Deorbit
The ATV was initially planned to undock from the ISS on 25 September 2012. However, a command program error during the undocking procedure delayed the release, and Edoardo Amaldi did not actually undock until 21:44 GMT on 28 September. The spacecraft finally deorbited and performed a destructive re-entry over the Pacific Ocean on 3 October 2012, taking with it a payload of station waste.

ATV missions

See also

Commercial Orbital Transportation Services, a NASA program to develop uncrewed commercial resupply spacecraft
Uncrewed spaceflights to the International Space Station
Similar cargo spacecraft
H-II Transfer Vehicle
Progress spacecraft
SpaceX Dragon

References

External links

ESA – ATV
ESA – Edoardo Amaldi Fact Sheet (PDF)
"ATV-3 docks to the ISS" . BIS-Space.com. 29 March 2012. Retrieved 20 May 2013.

Automated Transfer Vehicles
Spacecraft launched in 2012
Spacecraft which reentered in 2012
Supply vehicles for the International Space Station